The term C3 convertase may refer to:
 C3-convertase, an enzyme
 Alternative-complement-pathway C3/C5 convertase, an enzyme